Young Ejecta (formerly known as simply Ejecta) is an American synthpop duo, consisting of Neon Indian's Leanne Macomber and producer Joel Ford of Ford & Lopatin. The band name was changed to Young Ejecta in 2014 due to the group getting a copyright notice from the closely named DJ Ejeca. Macomber appears nude on all official album covers and promotional material, and in most of their music videos. In an interview with Brooklyn Based, she gives the background "Creating Ejecta as a sort of blank slate, Macomber set out to subvert any neat categorization of the band’s music. “I really insisted like, she should be naked all the time so that no one can say, ‘Well, they’re punks, they dress like this.'”"

History
In November 2013, Ejecta released their debut album, Dominae. In 2015 issued their mini-album and second studio LP The Planet.  The album received an indifferent review from PopMatters and a fairly positive one from Paste magazine.  Heather Phares of Allmusic describes the band's synthpop sound as "gauzy".

In August 2019, their song “Welcome to Love” was chosen as the outro audio of Netflix’s “Orange is the New Black” on the 10th episode of the 7th and final season.

Members
Leanne Macomber – vocals, synthesizers
Joel Ford – synthesizers, drum programming, producer

Discography

Albums

Studio albums

Mini-albums

Singles

As main artist

As featured artist

Music videos

References

Musical groups established in 2010
American synth-pop groups
Electronic music duos
American musical duos
Dream pop musical groups
2010 establishments in the United States